are notes used in Japan in conjunction with rice crackers called senbei in a similar way to fortune cookies.  Several publications make the claim that fortune cookies are derived from tsujiura senbei.

References

Japanese stationery
Japanese words and phrases